John Goodison may refer to:
 John R. Goodison (1866–1926), merchant and political figure in Newfoundland
 John Goodison (musician) (died 1995), English rock musician and producer